Sahebi may refer to:
 Sahebi, village in Miandorud-e Kuchak Rural District, in the Central District of Sari County, Mazandaran Province, Iran

People with the name
 Reza Sahebi (born 1972), retired Iranian football player and coach